Fosston is a village in the Canadian province of Saskatchewan within the Rural Municipality of Ponass Lake No. 367 and Census Division No. 14. The village was named after Fosston, Minnesota, the original home of five Rustad brothers, who homesteaded there.

History 
Fosston incorporated as a village on January 1, 1965.

Demographics 

See also 

 List of communities in Saskatchewan
 Villages of Saskatchewan

References

Villages in Saskatchewan
Division No. 14, Saskatchewan